John Mordaunt (British Army officer) (1697–1780) was a British Army general. General Mordaunt may also refer to:

Harry Mordaunt (1663–1720), English Army lieutenant general 
Thomas Osbert Mordaunt (1730–1809), British Army major general

See also
Eugène Mordant (1885–1959), French Army lieutenant general